Adrian Lee "Adi" Viveash (born 30 September 1969) is an English former professional footballer. He is currently Assistant Manager at Coventry City. He is most notable for his spells with Reading and Walsall during the 1990s. He played in the Reading team which won the Division Two title in 1994 and reached the Division One playoff final in 2000 and a year later achieved Promotion to the Championship in 2001. He also helped Walsall reach Division One in 1999.

Career

Viveash began his career with home-town club Swindon Town before joining Walsall in 1995. After two loan spells earlier in his career Viveash joined Reading permanently on 3 July 2000 on a three-year contract. He joined Oxford United on loan on 6 October 2002 with a view to a permanent move but a deal could not be agreed and he returned to Reading after two months. Viveash was released by Reading following the 2002–03 season and made a return to Swindon on 27 June 2003.
 
On 2 March 2004 Viveash joined Kidderminster Harriers on loan until the end of the season and on 6 August he returned for another loan spell, this time for one month. He moved to Conference National side Aldershot Town on a short-term contract on 3 December 2004 after having his Swindon Town contract terminated by mutual consent the day before. He was released by Aldershot on 7 January 2005 and joined Cirencester Town later that month.

In May 2007 he took over as manager of Cirencester Town. On 14 September 2008 Viveash resigned as Cirencester Town Manager after 16 months in charge to take up a coaching role with Chelsea's Academy. His final match in charge was a 2–1 derby defeat by Cinderford Town in which Viveash was sent to the stands for protesting against Cinderford's equaliser.

In July 2011 Viveash became Under-18 team manager at Chelsea having previously served as assistant Academy and assistant reserve team coach. In June 2014, following Dermot Drummy's promotion to international head coach, Adi Viveash took charge of the club's Under-21 squad for the 2014/15 season.

In May 2017, following nine successful years with Chelsea, Viveash left his role as development squad manager.

He joined Coventry City as assistant manager to Mark Robins in July 2017 following his departure from Chelsea. The pair subsequently led Coventry to two promotions in three seasons.

References

External links

Adi Viveash (Swindon-Town-FC.co.uk)

Living people
1969 births
Sportspeople from Swindon
English footballers
Association football defenders
Swindon Town F.C. players
Reading F.C. players
Barnsley F.C. players
Walsall F.C. players
Oxford United F.C. players
Kidderminster Harriers F.C. players
Aldershot Town F.C. players
Cirencester Town F.C. players
English Football League players
National League (English football) players
English football managers
Cirencester Town F.C. managers
Chelsea F.C. non-playing staff
Coventry City F.C. non-playing staff